The Last Place is the second studio album by American indie rock band Army Navy, released on July 12, 2011 on the band's own label, The Fever Zone. A music video for "Ode to Janice Melt", directed by Jeremy Konner and starring Jason Ritter and Simon Helberg, was released on September 15, 2011. "The Long Goodbye" appeared in  the movie Beastly, while "Last Legs" was featured in The Way, Way Back.

The album was met with positive reviews from music critics, getting 3 out of 5 from AllMusic and 7.0 out of 10 from Pitchfork Media.

Track listing

Personnel 
 Justin Kennedy - lead vocals, guitar
 Louie Schultz - lead guitar, vocals
 Douglas Randall - drums, vocals

References

External links 
 The Last Place on iTunes
 

2011 albums
Albums produced by Adam Lasus